LUC7 like 3 pre-mRNA splicing factor (LUC7L3), also known as Cisplatin resistance-associated overexpressed protein, or CROP, is a human gene.

This gene encodes a cisplatin resistance-associated overexpressed protein (CROP). The N-terminal half of the CROP contains cysteine/histidine motifs and leucine zipper-like repeats, and the C-terminal half is rich in arginine and glutamate residues (RE domain) and arginine and serine residues (RS domain). This protein localizes with a speckled pattern in the nucleus, and could be involved in the formation of splicesome via the RE and RS domains. Two alternatively spliced transcript variants encoding the same protein have been found for this gene.

References

External links

Further reading